Monroe is an "L" station on the CTA's Red Line. The station opened on October 17, 1943, as part of the State Street subway. The station is located in the Chicago Loop, and is open  24/7.

History
Monroe station has retained many of its original features from its opening in 1943, such as the officers' cabins, some auxiliary signaling and the Madison-Monroe mezzanine, which is named for the crossing of Madison Street and Monroe Street.
Until October 2006, there was a station between Monroe and Lake: Washington/State station. Washington/State is located near Monroe. It is still possible to walk on the abandoned station platform.

In 2009, the CTA put new station wall signs over the old blue station wall signs in order to better direct people to the mezzanines.

The station gives direct access to the adjacent Carson, Pirie, Scott and Company Building, a National Historic Landmark and Chicago Landmark that is also part of the Loop Retail Historic District.

Bus connections
CTA
  2 Hyde Park Express (weekday rush hours only)
  6 Jackson Park Express 
  10 Museum of Science and Industry (Memorial Day through Labor Day only) 
  29 State 
  36 Broadway 
  62 Archer (Owl Service) 
  146 Inner Lake Shore/Michigan Express 
  147 Outer DuSable Lake Shore Express 
  151 Sheridan

Notes and references

Notes

References

External links

 Monroe/State Station Page at  Chicago-'L'.org
 Train schedule (PDF) at CTA official site
Monroe/State Station Page CTA official site
Madison Street entrance from Google Maps Street View
Monroe Street entrance from Google Maps Street View

CTA Red Line stations
Railway stations in the United States opened in 1943